The Smash Hits Poll Winners Party was an awards ceremony which ran from 1979 (as the Smash Hits Readers' Poll) to 2005.

1979 awards 
The results for the 1979 Smash Hits Readers' Poll were published in the 20 March 1980 issue of the magazine.
 Band Of The Year: The Police
 Best Male Singer: Sting
 Best Female Singer: Debbie Harry
 Best Album of the Year: Reggatta de Blanc by The Police TV Programme Of The Year: Top of the Pops
 Best DJ/Radio Show Of The Year: John Peel
 Most Fanciable Person: Sting
 Best Single Of The Year: "Message in a Bottle" by The Police
 Worst Single Of The Year: "One Day at a Time" by Lena Martell
 Brightest Hope For 1980: Madness
 Twerp Of The Year: Gary Numan
 Bore Of The Year: Lena Martell

1980 awards 
The results for the 1980 Smash Hits Readers' Poll were published in the 18 March 1981 issue of the magazine.
 Band Of The Year: The Police
 Male Singer of the Year: Gary Numan
 Female Singer of the Year: Kate Bush
 Hottest New Act for 1981: Spandau Ballet
 Best Album of the Year: Zenyatta Mondatta by The Police Best Film of the Year: Breaking Glass
 TV Programme Of The Year: Not the Nine O'Clock News
 Radio Show Of The Year: John Peel
 Most Fanciable Male: Sting
 Most Fanciable Female: Debbie Harry
 Best Single Of The Year: "Message in a Bottle" by The Police
 Worst Single Of The Year: "Grandma" by St Winifred's School Choir

1981 awards 
The results for the 1981 Smash Hits Readers Poll were published in the 24 December 1981 issue of the magazine.
 Best Group: Adam and the Ants
 Best Female Singer: Toyah Willcox
 Best Male Singer: Gary Numan
 Best Album: Dare by The Human League Best Single: "Tainted Love" by Soft Cell Best TV Programme: Top of the Pops
 Best Radio Show: Radio One Top 40
 Most Appalling Record: "O Superman" by Laurie Anderson
 Most Promising New Act For 1982: Altered Images
 Most Fanciable Male Human Being Of The Year: Adam Ant
 Most Fanciable Female Human Being Of The Year: Toyah Willcox

1982 awards 
The results for the 1982 Smash Hits Readers Poll were published were published in the 23 December 1982 issue of the magazine.
 Best Group: Duran Duran
 Best Female Singer: Toyah Willcox
 Best Male Singer: Simon Le Bon
 Best Album: Rio by Duran Duran Best Single: "Save a Prayer" by Duran Duran Best TV Programme: Top of the Pops
 Best Radio DJ: Mike Read
 Most Promising New Act For 1983: Tears for Fears
 Most Fanciable Male Human Being Of The Year: Simon Le Bon
 Most Fanciable Female Human Being Of The Year: Kim Wilde
 Most Annoying Record: "Woti" by Captain Sensible

1983 awards 
The results for the 1983 Smash Hits Readers Poll were published were published in the 22 December 1983 issue of the magazine.
 Best Group: Duran Duran
 Best Female Singer: Tracey Ullman
 Best Male Singer: Simon Le Bon
 Best Album: Fantastic by Wham! Best Single: "Karma Chameleon" by Culture Club Best Video: "Union of the Snake" by Duran Duran Twit(s) Of The Year: Black Lace Event Of The Year: Duran Duran's charity concert at Villa Park 1983 Best TV Programme: Top of the Pops
 Best Radio DJ: Mike Read
 Most Promising Act For 1984: Howard Jones
 Most Fanciable Male Human Being Of The Year: John Taylor
 Most Fanciable Female Human Being Of The Year: Tracie Young

1984 awards 
The results for the 1984 Smash Hits Readers Poll were published in the 20 December 1984 issue of the magazine.
 Best Group: Duran Duran
 Best Female Singer: Alison Moyet
 Best Male Singer: Simon Le Bon
 Best Album: Seven and the Ragged Tiger by Duran Duran Best Single: "The Wild Boys" by Duran Duran Best TV Programme: The Young Ones
 Best Radio DJ: Mike Read
 Best Video: "The Wild Boys" by Duran Duran
 Prat Of The Year: Boy George
 Event Of The Year: Roger Taylor Wedding
 Most Promising New Act For 1985: Julian Lennon
 Most Fanciable Male Human Being Of The Year: John Taylor
 Most Fanciable Female Human Being Of The Year: Kim Wilde

1985 awards 
The results for the 1985 Smash Hits Readers Poll were published in the 18 December 1985 issue of the magazine.

 Best Group: Duran Duran
 Best Male Singer: Simon Le Bon
 Best Female Singer: Madonna
 Best Single: "A View to a Kill" by Duran Duran
 Best LP: Like a Virgin by Madonna Best Video: "Take On Me" by A-ha Best Music TV Programme: Top of the Pops
 Best Non-music TV: EastEnders
 Best DJ: Steve Wright
 Best Film: Desperately Seeking Susan
 Best TV Advertisement: OXO
 Event of the Year: Live Aid
 The non-event of the Year: Madonna Wedding
 Best Dressed Person: John Taylor
 Most Brilliant Haircut: Simon Le Bon
 Most Promising New Act For 1986: A-ha
 Most Fanciable Male of the Year: John Taylor
 Most Fanciable Female of the Year: Madonna

 Most Wonderful Human Being of the Year: Bob Geldof
 Biggest Prat Of The Year: George Michael
 Worst Group: Wham!
 Worst Male Singer: George Michael
 Worst Female Singer: Madonna
 Worst Single: "The Power of Love" by Jennifer Rush
 Worst LP: Born in the U.S.A. by Bruce Springsteen Worst Video: "If I Was" by Midge Ure Worst TV Programme: Top of the Pops
 Worst Non-music TV: Crossroads
 Worst DJ: Mike Read
 Worst Film: Rambo: First Blood Part II
 Worst TV Advertisement: Nescafé
 Worst Dressed Person: Bob Geldof
 Most Useless Haircut: Simon Le Bon
 Least Promising New Act For 1985: Arcadia
 Most Very Horrible Thing of the Year: George Michael's Beard

1986 awards 
The results for the 1986 Smash Hits Readers Poll were published in the 16 December 1986 issue of the magazine.

 Best Group: A-Ha
 Best Male Singer: Morten Harket
 Best Female Singer: Madonna
 Best Single: "Notorious" by Duran Duran
 Best LP: True Blue by Madonna Best Video: "Sledgehammer" by Peter Gabriel Best Music TV Programme: Top of the Pops
 Best Non-music TV: EastEnders
 Best DJ: Mike Smith
 Best Film: Top Gun
 Best TV Advertisement: Levi's
 Most Promising New Act For 1987: The Housemartins

 Most Fanciable Male of the Year: John Taylor
 Most Fanciable Female of the Year: Madonna
 Worst Male Singer: Morten Harket
 Worst Female Singer: Madonna
 Worst Video: "True Blue" by Madonna
 Worst TV Programme: Crossroads
 Worst DJ: Mike Read
 Worst TV Advertisement: Nescafé
 Worst Dressed Person: Bob Geldof
 Most Completely Useless Person: Margaret Thatcher
 Most Very Horrible Thing of the Year: George Michael

1987 awards 
The results for the 1987 Smash Hits Readers Poll was published in the 6 October 1987 issue of the magazine.

 Best Group: 5 Star
 Best Male Singer: Michael Jackson
 Best Female Singer: Madonna
 Best Video: "Bad" by Michael Jackson
 Best Single: "Never Gonna Give You Up" by Rick Astley
 Best LP: Bad by Michael Jackson Best TV Advertisement: Carling Black Label Best Film: Crocodile Dundee
 Best DJ: Mike Smith
 Best Music TV Programme: Top of the Pops
 Best Non-music TV: EastEnders
 Best Dressed Person: Jonathan Ross
 Most Promising New Act For 1988: Wet Wet Wet
 Most Wonderful Human Being Of The Year

 Most Fanciable Male of the Year: Phillip Schofield
 Most Fanciable Female of the Year: Madonna
 Worst Group: Beastie Boys
 Worst Male Singer: Terence Trent D'Arby
 Worst Female Singer: Samantha Fox
 Worst Video: "Star Trekkin'" by The Firm
 Worst Single: "Star Trekkin'" by The Firm
 Worst LP: Bad by Michael Jackson Worst TV Advertisement: Nescafé Worst Film: Superman IV: The Quest for Peace
 Worst DJ: Janice Long
 Worst TV Programme: Crossroads
 Worst dressed Person: Bob Geldof
 Most Completely Useless Person: Margaret Thatcher

1988 awards
The 1988 Smash Hits Poll Winners Party ceremony was held on Sunday, 30 October 1988 at The Royal Albert Hall in London. The Party was broadcast on BBC and Radio One from 3.30-5 pm. Phillip Schofield introduced the show. The Results for the 1988 Smash Hits Readers Poll were published in the 15 November 1988 issue of the magazine.

 Best Group: Bros
 Best Male Solo Singer: Michael Jackson
 Best Female Solo Singer: Kylie Minogue
 Best House/Rap/Dance Music Act: Salt 'N' Pepa
 Most Promising Solo Artist: Yazz
 Most Promising New Group: Brother Beyond
 Best D.J: Bruno Brookes
 Most Fanciable Male: Matt Goss
 Most Fanciable Female: Kylie Minogue
 Best Dressed Person: Matt Goss
 Best Single: "I Owe You Nothing" by Bros
 Best LP: Popped In Souled Out by Wet Wet Wet Best Film: Dirty Dancing
 Best Pop Video: "I Owe You Nothing" by Bros
 Best Music TV Programme: Top of the Pops
 Best Non Music TV Programme: Neighbours

 Best TV Advert: Coca-Cola
 Worst Group of The Year: Bros
 Worst Male Solo singer: Glenn Medeiros
 Worst Female Solo singer: Tiffany Darwish
 Worst House/Rap/Dance Music Act: Salt 'N' Pepa
 Worst D.J: Tony Blackburn
 Worst Dressed Person: Rick Astley
 Most Completely Useless Person: Margaret Thatcher
 Worst Haircut: Glenn Medeiros
 Most Horrible Thing: Spiders
 Worst Single: "Nothing's Gonna Change My Love For You" by Glenn Medeiros
 Worst LP: by Push by Bros Worst Film: Teen Wolf Too
 Worst Pop Video: "Nothing's Gonna Change My Love For You" by Glenn Medeiros
 Worst TV Programme: EastEnders
 Worst TV Advert: Nescafé

1989 awards
Phillip Schofield was the host at Docklands Arena on 29 October 1989.

 Best Group: Bros
 Best Male Solo Singer: Jason Donovan
 Best Female Solo Singer: Kylie Minogue
 Best Rock Outfit Singer: Guns N' Roses
 Best House/Dance Act: Neneh Cherry
 Best Newcomer: Big Fun
 Best Single: Bros - Too Much
 Best LP: Ten Good Reasons - Jason Donovan 
 Best Pop Video: Bros - Too Much
 Most Promising New Solo Artist: Bobby Brown
 Best DJ: Bruno Brookes
 Most Fanciable Male on the Planet: Jason Donovan
 Most Fanciable Female on the Planet: Kylie Minogue
 Best Film: Batman 1989
 Best Music TV Programme: Top Of The Pops
 Best Non-music TV Programme: Neighbours
 Most Very Horrible Thing: Spiders
 Worst Dressed Person: Prince
 Worst Haircut: Pat Sharp

1990 awards
Phillip Schofield was the host at Docklands Arena on 11 November 1990.

 Best New Act: Betty Boo
 Best Group: New Kids On The Block
 Best Male Singer: Jason Donovan
 Best Female Singer: Madonna
 Best Rock Act: Jon Bon Jovi
 Best Dance Act: MC Hammer
 Best Single: Tonight
 Best LP: Step By Step
 Best Pop Video: Opposites Attract
 Best Dressed Person: Joey McIntyre
 Best DJ: Bruno Brookes
 Most Fanciable Man of the Year: Joey McIntyre
 Best Film: Gremlins 2
 Best Music TV Programme: Top Of The Pops
 Best Non-music Programme: Home And Away
 Worst Single: Itsy Bitsy Tiny Weeny Yellow Polka Dot Bikini
 Worst Dressed Person: Kylie Minogue
 Most Completely Useless Person: Timmy Mallett
 Worst Haircut: Pat Sharp

1991 awards
Phillip Schofield was the host at Docklands Arena on 26 October 1991. The event was notorious for the incident in 1991 involving Phillip Schofield and Carter USM, when the band's performance was cut short, causing them to trash up the stage. Following this, Schofield made a remark about the band's behaviour, their guitarist Fruitbat rugby tackled him to the floor. The band was temporarily banned from performing on television but its ticket sales for its tour soared.

 Best New Act: Dannii Minogue
 Best New Group: Color Me Badd
 Best Group In The World: New Kids on the Block
 Best British Group: EMF
 Best Female Solo Singer: Madonna
 Best Male Solo Singer: Jason Donovan
 Best Dance Act: Marky Mark and the Funky Bunch
 Best Indie Act: The Farm
 Best Rock Outfit: Extreme
 Best Single: "(Everything I Do) I Do It for You" by Bryan Adams
 Best LP: No More Games/The Remix Album by New Kids on the Block Best Pop Video: "Call It What You Want" by New Kids on the Block Best Dressed Person: Jordan Knight Best DJ: Bruno Brookes Most Fanciable Male on the Planet: Jordan Knight Most Fanciable Female on the Planet: Madonna Best Film: Robin Hood: Prince of Thieves
 Best Male Actor: Christian Slater
 Best Female Actor: Julia Roberts
 Best Music TV Programme: Top of the Pops
 Best Non-music TV Programme: Beverly Hills, 90210
 Worst Group: New Kids on the Block
 Worst Female Solo Singer: Kylie Minogue
 Worst Male Solo Singer: Chesney Hawkes
 Worst Single: "The One and Only" by Chesney Hawkes
 Worst LP: Buddy's Song by Chesney Hawkes Worst Pop Video: "The One and Only" by Chesney Hawkes Worst Dressed Person: Timmy Mallett Worst Film: Teenage Mutant Ninja Turtles II: The Secret of the Ooze
 Worst Haircut: Chesney Hawkes
 Worst TV Programme: Brookside
 The Most Completely Useless Person: Timmy Mallett

1992 awards
The 1992 Smash Hits Poll Winners Party ceremony, honored the best and worst musics, films, TV of 1992 from December 1991 to December 1992 and took place on 6 December 1992, at Olympia in London. Simon Mayo and New Kids on the Block member Jordan Knight hosted the event.

 Hero of 1992: Linford Christie
 Best New Act: The Shamen
 Best British Group: Take That
 Best Group in the World: Take That
 Best Male Solo Singer: Michael Jackson
 Best Female Solo Singer: Madonna 
 Best Single: "A Million Love Songs" by Take That
 Best LP: Take That & Party by Take That Best Video: "I Found Heaven" by Take That Best Film: Wayne's Worrd
 Best Film Actor: Christian Slater
 Best Film Actress: Winona Ryder
 Best TV Programme: Home and Away
 Best TV Actor: Les Hill
 Best TV Actress: Rebekah Elmaloglou
 Best Dance Act: Marky Mark
 Best Rock Outfit: Extreme
 Best Indie Act: The Farm

 Most Fanciable Male: Mark Owen
 Most Fanciable Female: Madonna
 Best Haircut: Mark Owen
 Best Dressed Person: Jordan Knight
 Best DJ: Bruno Brookes
 Villain of 1992: John Major
 Worst Group: New Kids on the Block
 Worst Male Solo Singer: Jason Donovan
 Worst Female Solo Singer: Dannii
 Worst Video: "Ebeneezer Goode" by The Shamen
 Worst Film: Batman Returns
 Worst Film Actor/Actress: Madonna 
 Worst TV Programme: Eldorado
 Worst TV Actor/Actress: Melissa Bell
 Worst Dressed Person: Madonna 
 Least Fanciable Male Star: Jimmy Nail 
 Least Fanciable Female Star: Madonna

1993 awards

Andi Peters and Will Smith were the hosts at Wembley Arena on 5 December 1993.

1993 was the year that introduced the "Best New Roadshow Act" award which would launch new acts who would perform on the Smash Hits Tour previous to the event; the winners would be voted by fans at the show of which US pop band E.Y.C. (Damon Butler, Dave Loeffler and Trey Parker) were the first to win this award and perform their new single "Feelin' Alright". The award would later launch the careers of Boyzone, Backstreet Boys, Five and many others in the following years.

 Best British Group: Take That 
 Best Male Solo Singer: Michael Jackson 
 Best Female Solo Singer: Whitney Houston 
 Best New Roadshow Act: E.Y.C.
 Best New Act: Eternal
 Most Fanciable Male Star: Mark Owen
 Best Dancer In Pop: Jason Orange
 Best Dance Act: 2 Unlimited 
 Best Rock Act: Meat Loaf 
 Best Group in the World: Take That 
 Best Album: Everything Changes by Take That Best Pop Video: Pray by Take That Best Single: Boom! Shake the Room by DJ Jazzy Jeff & The Fresh Prince Best Radio DJ: Neil Fox 
 Best Haircut: Robbie Williams 
 Best Dressed Person: Mark Owen 
 Best Film Actor: Tom Cruise 
 Best Film Actress: Whoopi Goldberg 
 Best person on Telly: Chris Evans Best TV Programme: The Big Breakfast 
 Best Film: Jurassic Park
 Least Fanciable Male Star: Brian Harvey
 Worst Film Actress: Madonna
 Worst Film: Body of Evidence
 Worst Female Singer: Madonna
 Worst Dressed Person: Madonna
 Worst TV programme: Emmerdale
 Worst Person on Telly: Jeremy Beadle
 Sad Loser of 1993: John Major
 Most Tragic Haircut: Brian Harvey

1994 awards
Andi Peters with actor Dean Cain and volleyball player Gabrielle Reece were the hosts at Docklands Arena on 4 December 1994.

 Best New Act: PJ and Duncan
 Best British Group: Take That 
 Best Group in the World: Take That 
 Best Male Solo Singer: Sean Maguire 
 Best Female Solo Singer: Mariah Carey
 Best Rock Act: Bon Jovi 
 Best Indie Act: Blur
 Best Dance Act: 2 Unlimited 
 Best Pop Video: Sure by Take That Best Single: Sure by Take That Best Album: Parklife by Blur Best New Roadshow Act: Boyzone Most Fanciable Male Star: Mark Owen Most Fanciable Female Star: Pamela Anderson Best TV Programme: The O-Zone /Top of the Pops (Joint winners)
 Best person on Telly: Andi Peters
 Best Comedian: Jack Dee
 
 Best Radio DJ: Steve Wright 
 Best Sports Star: Linford Christie
 Best Film Actor: Speed 
 Best Film Actor: Keanu Reeves 
 Best Film Actress: Winona Ryder 
 Best Haircut: Robbie Williams 
 Best Dressed Person: Mark Owen 
 Worst person on Telly: Chris Evans
 Worst Male Singer: Sean Maguire 
 Worst Female Singer: Kylie Minogue
 Least Fanciable Female Star: Madonna
 Worst Dressed Person: Madonna
 Sad Loser of 1994: John Major
 Worst Group: East 17
 Least Fanciable Male Star: Brian Harvey
 Worst TV Programme: Emmerdale 
 Most Tragic Haircut: East 17

1995 awards
Andi Peters and Dani Behr were the hosts at London Arena on 3 December 1995.

 Best New Act: Boyzone
 Best British Group: Take That 
 Best Group in the World: Take That 
 Best Male Solo Singer: Michael Jackson 
 Best Female Solo Singer: Mariah Carey
 Best Rock Act: Bon Jovi 
 Best Indie-Type Band: Blur
 Best Dance/Soul Act: Eternal 
 Best Pop Video: Never Forget by Take That Best Single: Back for Good by Take That Best Album: Nobody Else by Take That Most Fanciable Male Star: Mark Owen Most Fanciable Female Star: Louise Best TV Programme: Top of the Pops
 Best TV Actor: Robson Green
 Best TV Actress: Anna Friel
 Best TV Presenter: Andi Peters
 Best Comedian: Lee Evans
 Best Radio DJ: Chris Evans
 Best Sports Star: Eric Cantona
 Best Film: Batman Forever 
 Best Film Actor: Tom Hanks 
 Best Film Actress: Sandra Bullock 
 Best Haircut: Mark Owen 
 Best Dressed Person: Mark Owen 
 
 Worst Group: Take That
 Worst Male Solo Singer: Michael Jackson 
 Worst Female Solo Singer: Kylie Minogue
 Worst Single: Fairground by Simply Red Worst Film: Power Rangers
 Worst Film Actor: Hugh Grant 
 Worst Film Actress: Sharon Stone 
 Worst TV Actor: Sean Maguire 
 Worst TV Actress: Pamela Anderson
 Worst TV Presenter: Zoe Ball
 Least Fanciable Female Star: Pamela Anderson
 Worst Dressed Person: Jarvis Cocker
 Least Fanciable Male Star: Jarvis Cocker
 Worst TV Programme: Emmerdale 
 Most Tragic Haircut: Howard Donald
 Sad Loser of 1995: Robbie Williams

1996 awards
The 1996 Smash Hits Poll Winners Party ceremony was held on Sunday, 1 December 1996, at the London Arena. The Party was broadcast on BBC1 at 3.30 pm. Ant & Dec and Lily Savage presented the show. The Results for the 1996 Smash Hits Readers Poll were published in the 17 December 1996 issue of the magazine.

 Best Group: Spice Girls
 Best International Group: Boyzone
 Best Male Singer: Peter Andre
 Best Female Singer: Louise Redknapp
 Best Dance/Soul Act: Eternal
 Best Rock Outfit: Bon Jovi
 Best Indie Type Band: Oasis
 Our Price Best Single: "Words" by Boyzone
 Our Price Best Album Cover: Natural by Peter Andre Best Album: A Different Beat by Boyzone Best Pop Video: "Say You'll Be There" by Spice Girls Best Film: Independence Day
 Best Film Actor: Will Smith
 Best Film Actress: Sandra Bullock
 Best TV Programme: EastEnders
 Best Person On TV: Paul Nicholls
 Best Radio DJ: Neil Fox

 Best Dressed Person: Ronan Keating
 Best Haircut: Ronan Keating
 Best New Act: Spice Girls
 Funniest Person In The World: Robbie Williams
 Most Fanciable Person: Ronan Keating
 Best Sport Star '96: Jamie Redknapp
 Worst Group: Upside Down
 Worst Male Singer: Robbie Williams
 Worst Female Singer: Björk
 Worst Film: Barb Wire
 Worst Person In A Film: Pamela Anderson
 Worst TV Programme: Emmerdale
 Worst Person On TV: Chris Evans
 Most Tragic Haircut: Mark Owen
 Least Fanciable Person: Liam Gallagher
 Worst Dressed Person: Mark Owen
 Loser Of '96: Robbie Williams

1997 awards
Ant & Dec and Jayne Middlemiss were the hosts at London Arena on 30 November 1997.

 Best International Band: Backstreet Boys
 Best British Group: Spice Girls
 Best New Act Of '97: Hanson
 Sports Star Of '97: David Beckham
 Best Male Singer: Kavana
 Best Female Singer: Louise Redknapp
 Best Album: Backstreet's Back by Backstreet Boys Best Video: "Everybody (Backstreet's Back)" by Backstreet Boys Best Single: "MMMBop" by Hanson Best Indie/Type Band: Oasis Best Dance/Soul Act: Eternal Best Album Cover: Backstreet's Back by Backstreet Boys Best Rock Outfit: Bon Jovi Best Dressed Female: Louise Redknapp Best Dressed Male: Ronan Keating Best Male Haircut: Nick Carter Most Fanciable Male: Taylor Hanson Most Fanciable Female: Louise Redknapp Hero/Heroine Of 1997: Diana, Princess Of Wales Best Radio DJ: Dr Fox Best TV Actor: Paul Nicholls Best TV Actress: Martine McCutcheon Best Comedian/Comedienne Winner: Lily Savage Best Film: Men in Black
 Best Film Actor: Will Smith
 Best Film Actress: Sandra Bullock
 Best Female Haircut: Jennifer Aniston
 Best TV Programme: Friends
 Worst TV Actor/Actress: Paul Nicholls
 Least Fanciable Male: Peter Andre
 Sad Loser Of '97 Winner: Peter Andre
 Most Tragic Haircut Of '97 Winner: Peter Andre
 Worst Single: "Spice Up Your Life" by Spice Girls
 Worst TV Presenter: Zoe Ball
 Worst Group: Spice Girls
 Worst Dressed Person: Geri Halliwell
 Least Fanciable Female: Geri Halliwell
 Worst TV Programme: Emmerdale
 Worst Female Singer: Björk
 Worst Male Singer: Mark Owen
 Worst Film: Bean
 Worst Film Actor/Actress: Pamela Anderson

1998 awards
Melanie Sykes, Stephen Gately, Meat Loaf and Will Smith were the hosts at London Arena on 13 December 1998.
 Best New Act: B*Witched
 Princess Of Pop: Billie
 Prince Of Pop: Ronan Keating
 Best Dressed Man: Ronan Keating
 Most Fanciable Male: Ronan Keating
 Best Sports Star: Michael Owen
 Hero Of 1998: Michael Owen
 Best Male Solo: Robbie Williams
 Best Female Solo: Billie
 Best Haircut: Scott Robinson from 5ive
 Most Fanciable Female: Louise
 Best British Band: 5ive
 Best Album: 5ive by 5ive Best Film Actress: Kate Winslet Best Film: Titanic
 Best Boy Band: Westlife
 Best TV Actor: Adam Rickett
 Best TV Programme: EastEnders
 Best TV Actress: Martine McCutcheon
 Best Band On Planet Pop: Boyzone

1999 awards
Steps were the hosts at London Arena on 5 December 1999.

 Best Band on Planet Pop '99: Backstreet Boys
 Best British Band: 5ive
 Best Non-British Band: Backstreet Boys
 Best Male Solo Star: Robbie Williams
 Best Female Solo Star: Britney Spears
 Best Single of '99: "I Want It That Way" by Backstreet Boys
 Best Album: Millennium by Backstreet Boys Best Video: "Larger than Life" by Backstreet Boys Best New Act: S Club 7 Hero/Heroine of '99: Stephen Gately Most Fanciable Male on the Planet: Ronan Keating Most Fanciable Female on the Planet: Britney Spears Best Parent in Pop: Ronan Keating Best Dressed Male: Ronan Keating Best Dressed Female: Britney Spears Best Male Haircut: Scott 5ive Best Female Haircut: Britney Spears Best Dance/Soul Act: TLC Best Indie/Rock Act: Stereophonics Best Dance Choon: "Blue (Da Ba Dee)" by Eiffel 65 Best Dancer in Pop: Britney Spears Best TV Actor: Jack Ryder Best TV Actress: Patsy Palmer 
 Best TV Programme: EastEnders
 Best Film: Austin Powers 2
 Best Film Actor: Will Smith
 Best Film Actress: Julia Roberts
 Best DJ on the Radio: Dr Fox
 Sports Star of '99: Michael Owen
 Worst Group: Spice Girls
 Worst Male Singer: Adam Rickett
 Worst Female Singer: Melanie C
 Worst Single: "Goin' Down" by Melanie C
 Worst Album: My First Album by Lolly Worst Video: "Goin' Down" by Melanie C Worst Dressed Person: Melanie C Most Tragic Haircut: Melanie C 
 Worst TV Actor: Adam Rickett Least Fanciable Person: Adam Rickett Worst TV Programme: Emmerdale
 Worst Film: Star Wars: Episode I – The Phantom Menace
 Worst Film Actor: Leonardo DiCaprio
 Worst Person on the Radio: Chris Evans
 Sad Loser of '99: Billie Piper

2000 awards
The hosts for this year were Katy Hill, Louise Redknapp and Richard Blackwood at London Arena on 10 December 2000. This was the last event shown on the BBC after 12 years. 
 Best Band in Planet Pop 2000: Westlife
 Best British Band: Five
 Best Non-British Band: Westlife
 Best Female Solo Star: Britney Spears
 Best Rapper: Eminem
 Best New Male Solo Star: Craig David
 Best New Female Solo Star: Samantha Mumba
 Best Album: Coast to Coast by Westlife
 Best Single: My Love by Westlife
 Best Video: Take On Me by A1
 Best Male Solo Star: Ronan Keating
 Best Dancer in Pop: Britney Spears
 Best Dance Choon: Zombie Nation
 Best Dressed Male: Ronan Keating
 Best Dressed Female: Britney Spears
 Best Haircut: Kian Egan
 Best DJ: Dr Fox
 Best Film: Billy Elliot
 Best Film Actor: Leonardo DiCaprio
 Best Film Actress: Julia Roberts
 Hero/Heroine of 2000: Steve Redgrave
 Most Fanciable Male on the Planet: Shane Filan
 Most Fanciable Female on the Planet: Britney Spears

2001 awards
Vernon Kay, Margherita Taylor, Emma Bunton and Ritchie Neville were the hosts which took place at London Arena on 9 December 2001. The first one shown on Channel 4 and renamed Smash Hits T4 Poll Winners Party.

Best Band - Westlife 
Best Newcomer - Blue 
Best Live Act - Steps
Best Male Solo - Shaggy 
Best Female Solo - Britney Spears 
Best R&B Act - Destiny's Child
Woolworths Best Single - Atomic Kitten: Whole Again
Woolworths Best Album - Westlife: World of Our Own
Most Fanciable Male - Ben Adams
Most Fanciable Female - Rachel Stevens 
Best Male Haircut - Nicky Byrne 
Best Female Haircut - Faye Tozer 
Top TV Programme of the Year - EastEnders
Best Music Video - Gorillaz: Clint Eastwood
Best Sports Star  - David Beckham
Best TV actor  - Jack Ryder
Best Radio DJ  - Sara Cox 
Best New Tour Act  - 3SL
Hall of Fame  - Steps

2002 awards
Vernon Kay hosted again but this time he was joined by June Sarpong and Kelly Osbourne who had to leave midway through the awards.
Best Band On Planet Pop - Westlife 
Best UK Band - Blue
Best International Act - Westlife 
Woolworths Best Newcomer On Planet Pop - Gareth Gates
Best Live Act - Blue
Best Male Solo - Gareth Gates 
Best Female Solo - Pink
Best Dance Act - Lasgo 
Best Rock Act - The Calling 
Best R&B/Garage Act - So Solid Crew
Woolworths Best Single - Liberty X: Just a Little
Best Album - Sugababes: Angels with Dirty Faces
Most Fanciable Male - Gareth Gates
Most Fanciable Female - Holly Valance 
Party Mentalist of the Year - Brian McFadden
Mouth Almighty of the Year - Jade Goody
Top of Mop Award - Gareth Gates 
Flop Mop Award - Christina Aguilera
Best Dressed Male in Pop - Darius
Best Dressed Female in Pop - Liz McClarnon 
Worst Dressed Person in Pop - Christina Aguilera 
Top TV Programme of the Year - EastEnders
Top Movie of the Year - Austin Powers in Goldmember
Most Evil Man in Pop - Simon Cowell
Most Hideous (The Most Minging Thing Ever) - Jade Goody 
Smash Hits Cover of the Year - Westlife 
Top Pop Pair Award - MC Harvey and Alesha Dixon
Best Music Video - Will Young: Light My Fire 
Hall of Fame - Westlife

2003 awards

 Hall of Fame: Westlife
 Best Band in the World Ever: Busted
 Best British Band: Busted
 Stars of the Year: Busted
 Comeback King/Queen: Mark Owen
 Hot New Talent: Girls Aloud
 Best Male Solo Star: Gareth Gates
 Best Female Solo Star: Christina Aguilera
 Most Fanciable Male on the Planet: Justin Timberlake
 Most Fanciable Female on the Planet: Beyoncé
 Best Dressed Male: Duncan James
 Best Dressed Female: Rachel Stevens
 Best Urban Act: Big Brovaz

 Best Rock Act: Good Charlotte
 Best International Act: Westlife
 Best Dance Act: DJ Sammy
 Best Dancer in Pop: Justin Timberlake
 Best Single: "Sunshine" by Gareth Gates
 Best Album: Busted by Busted Best Music Video: "Crazy in Love" by Beyoncé Best Film: Pirates of the Caribbean
 TV Show of the Year: Pop Idol
 Worst single: "Fast Food Song" by Fast Food Rockers
 Top Pop Mop: Matt Willis
 Flop Pop Mop: Kelly Osbourne

2004 awards
The 2004 Smash Hits Poll Winners Party ceremony was held on Sunday, 21 November 2004, at the Wembley Arena.

 Hall of Fame: Kylie Minogue
 Star of the Year: McFly
 Best New Talent: Natasha Bedingfield
 Sporting Hero of the Year: Kelly Holmes
 Best UK Band: McFly
 Best Solo Artist: Usher
 Best Single: "Thunderbirds Are Go" by Busted
 Best Video: "That Girl" by McFly
 Best Album: Room on the 3rd Floor by McFly Best International Band: Maroon 5 Best Rock Act: The Darkness Best Dance Act: Shapeshifters Best R&B Act: Usher Best Hip-Hop Act: Eminem Best Dressed Star: Rachel Stevens Best TV Show: EastEnders
 Best TV Personality: Shane Ritchie
 Best Film: Shrek 2
 Best Film Star: Orlando Bloom
 Favourite Ringtone: "Thunderbirds Are Go" by Busted
 Favourite Download: "Flying Without Wings" by Westlife
 Most Fanciable Male on the Planet: Danny Jones
 Most Fanciable Female on the Planet: Rachel Stevens
 Top Pop Mop: Matt Willis
 Flop Pop Mop: Marilyn Manson
 Worst Dressed Star: Will Young

2005 awards
Hosts were Steve Jones and Miquita Oliver

 Hall of Fame: Britney Spears
 Star of the Year: McFly
 Hot New Talent: Son of Dork
 Best Newcomer: 
 Best UK Band: McFly
 Best Solo Artist: Lee Ryan
 Best Single: "All About You" by McFly
 Best Album: Wonderland by McFly Best International Band: Green Day Best Rock Act: Green Day Best Dance Act: Uniting Nations Best R'n'B Act: Akon Best Hip Hop Act: Eminem Best Video: "Don't Cha" by Pussycat Dolls Party Animal of the Year: Charlotte Church Favourite Ringtone: Crazy Frog Hottest Showbiz Couple: Cheryl Tweedy and Ashley Cole Sh! Style Icon: Gwen Stefani Best TV Show: EastEnders
 TV Star Of The Year: The X Factor Judges - Simon/Louis/Sharon
 Best Movie: Charlie and the Chocolate Factory
 Movie Star Of The Year: Johnny Depp
 Best Sports Star: David Beckham
 Most Fanciable Female: Rachel Stevens
 Most Snoggable Male: Danny Jones
 Best Dressed Star: Kylie Minogue
 Worst Dressed Star: Britney Spears
 Top Mop (Best Hair): Dougie Poynter
 Flop Mop (Worst Hair): Peter Andre

References

Magazines about the media
Awards established in 1988
Awards disestablished in 2005
Award ceremonies in the United Kingdom
BBC Television shows
Channel 4 original programming